Pama or PAMA may refer to:

Places
 Pama, Austria
 Pama, Burkina Faso
 Pama Township, Tibet

As an acronym
 PAMA (liqueur), a pomegranate liqueur produced in the United States
 Peel Art Gallery, Museum and Archives, a publicly run facility in Ontario, Canada
 Professional Aviation Maintenance Association
 Pulse-address multiple access, channel access method used in telecommunications networks

People
 Balbir Singh Pama, Indian general and author
 Cornelis Pama (1916–1994), Dutch bookseller, publisher, heraldist and genealogist
 Pama Fou (born 1990), Australian rugby union player

Other uses
 PAMA (Pakistan Automotive Manufacturers Association)
 PAMA (Prototype: Autonomous Management Agent), a giant fictional computer in Minecraft Story Mode
 Pama International, British eight-piece reggae band
 Pama Records, a UK ska and reggae label of the 1960s and 1970s
 PAMA Shopping Village, shopping center in Malta 
 Pama River, in Chile
 Paman languages
Pama language (disambiguation)